Kriswontwo is a Danish producer from Copenhagen.

Georgia Anne Muldrow said the following about him: "Kriswontwo is gifted with the ability to trust and fully follow through on his instinct; he polishes up his work with great attention to detail but he doesn't sacrifice the rawness of his original idea. It takes a whole lot of talent and discipline to be able to make that initial kneejerk reaction the centerpiece of such an elegant sound."

In 2016 a Youtube video surfaced showing Yasiin Bey (fka. Mos Def) working on lyrics to a beat by Kriswontwo.

In 2017 Dr. Dre played "Flawless (feat. Phat Kat)" from Kriswontwo's second album "Back To One" on his radio show, The Pharmacy.

Discography

Albums 
 Kriswontwo - Raw Beats 2013-2017 (2021)
 Kriswontwo - Back To One (2017) 
 Kriswontwo - Ceremoni (2015)

EPs 
 Nicholas Ryan Gant - Maze (2016) 
 WEON - Neon The Won (2015) 
 Georgia Anne Muldrow - Ms. One (2014) 
 WEON - WEON (2013) 
 Blacc El - Clap, Snap, Rock (2013)
 Nappion - Breaking Ice (2012)

Singles 
 Prince Po - Here We Go (2017)
 Jallal - Break of Dawn (2016) 
 Kazi feat. Bobby Earth & Nicholas Ryan Gant - Demons (2016) 
 Te'Amir - Move Just (2015) 
 Pede B - Lille Modelpige (2013)
 Mighty Male ft Klumben, Kidd & Skygg - Sulten (2013)
 Larry & Kay - Outskirts (2012)

Remixes 
 Ida Nielsen - I Really Think Ur Cute [feat. Kuku Agami] (2017)
 Bobby Bovell - Nightwatch (2017)
 Eros feat. Jen Miller - Blind (2016) 
 Kazi feat. C Keys & Dex - The Horror (2016)
 Bobby Bovell feat. Dennis Bovell - Love, Love (2016) 
 Blitz The Ambassador feat. Sarkodie - Internationally Known (2014)
 Felix De Luca feat. Kay & Familia Loca - Everything Is Camouflage (2012)

References

External links
Kriswontwo official website
Kriswontwo on Soundcloud
Kriswontwo on Facebook
Kriswontwo on Twitter

Year of birth missing (living people)
Living people
Danish record producers